Alex Moyer was a linebacker in the National Football League. Moyer was selected by the Miami Dolphins in the third round of the 1985 NFL draft. He played during two seasons.

Early life
Moyer attended the St. John's Military Academy in Delafield, Wisconsin.

References

People from Delafield, Wisconsin
Players of American football from Detroit
Players of American football from Wisconsin
Miami Dolphins players
Northwestern Wildcats football players
American football linebackers
1963 births
Living people